Dondice galaxiana is a species of colourful sea slug, an aeolid nudibranch, a marine gastropod mollusk in the family Facelinidae.

Distribution
This species was described from Puerto Vallarta, Noche Iguana, Bahía de Banderas, on the Pacific Ocean coast of Mexico. Additional specimens from Clipperton Island and Costa Rica were included in the original description.

References

Facelinidae
Gastropods described in 2012